Paunu is a surname. Notable people with the surname include:

 Ahti Paunu, Finnish singer
Päivi Paunu (1946–2016), Finnish singer
Penna Paunu (1868–1920), Finnish cooperative manager and politician

Finnish-language surnames